The 21st Robert Awards ceremony was held in 2004 in Copenhagen, Denmark. Organized by the Danish Film Academy, the awards honoured the best in Danish and foreign film of 2003.

Honorees

Best Danish Film 
 The Inheritance – Per Fly

Best Children's Film 
  – Anders Gustafsson

Best Director 
 Per Fly – The Inheritance

Best Screenplay 
 Lars von Trier – Dogville

Best Actor in a Leading Role 
 Ulrich Thomsen – The Inheritance

Best Actress in a Leading Role 
 Birthe Neumann –

Best Actor in a Supporting Role 
 Peter Steen – The Inheritance

Best Actress in a Supporting Role 
 Ghita Nørby – The Inheritance

Best Cinematography 
 Anthony Dod Mantle – It's All About Love

Best Production Design 
 Ben van Os & Jette Lehmann – It's All About Love

Best Costume Design 
 Manon Rasmussen – Dogville

Best Makeup 
 Charlotte Laustsen – The Green Butchers

Best Special Effects 
 Peter Hjorth – It's All About Love

Best Sound Design 
 Morten Green – Reconstruction

Best Editing 
 Mikkel E. G. Nielsen & Peter Brandt – Reconstruction

Best Score 
 Halfdan E. – The Inheritance

Best Song 
 Carpark North – "Transparent & Glasslike" – Midsommer

Best Documentary Short 
 Krig – Jens Loftager

Best Documentary Feature 
 Med ret til at dræbe – Morten Henriksen & Peter Øvig Knudsen

Best Short Featurette 
 Lille far – Michael W. Horsten

Best Long Featurette 
 Dykkerdrengen – Morten Giese

Best Non-American Film 
 Good Bye Lenin! – Wolfgang Becker

Best American Film 
 The Hours – Stephen Daldry

Audience Award 
 The Inheritance

FilmKopi prisen 
 Super16 (film school)

See also 

 2004 Bodil Awards

References

External links 
  
 Robert Festival Awards for 2004 at the Internet Movie Database

2003 film awards
Robert Awards ceremonies
2004 in Copenhagen